The Poleta Formation is a geological unit known for the exceptional fossil preservation in the Indian Springs Lagerstätte, located in eastern California and Nevada.

Occurrence 

The formation dates to the Stage 3 of the yet-to-be-ratified Cambrian Series 2; the lower portion base of the formation and the youngest Lagerstätte beds date to the Nevadella trilobite zone (= Laurentian Montezuman stage), with higher beds dating to the Olenellus trilobite zone (= Laurentian Dyeran stage), making the formation the same age as the Sirius Passet and just younger than the Chengjiang. It outcrops in Esmeralda County in western Nevada.

Depositional setting 

The formation was deposited on an offshore shelf, and experienced storm-related pulses of siliciclastic sediment input. Like many other Burgess Shale-type Lagerstätten, this unit was deposited on the Cordilleran margin of the Laurentian continent; it is among the oldest of the Lagerstätten from this region.

Taphonomy 
The fossil preservation is markedly similar to that in Utah Lagerstätten, particularly the Spence Shale.  The quality of preservation was obtained by the rapid burial of organisms in obrution events, which buried them out of reach of would-be scavengers.

Fauna 

Most of the fauna is biomineralized, including brachiopods, hyolithids, trilobites, archeocyathids, and helicoplacoids, which are often articulated.  Non-mineralized components of these fossils are also preserved, as are sponges, anomalocaridid parts, and a range of algae and cyanobacteria.

Trace fossils, mainly Planolites, are also common; ichnofossils generally lie on the bedding plane and very few penetrate more than  into the sediment.

See also

 List of fossiliferous stratigraphic units in Nevada
 Paleontology in Nevada

References 

Geologic formations of California
Geologic formations of Nevada
Cambrian System of North America
Cambrian California
Cambrian Nevada
Lagerstätten
Paleontology in California
Paleontology in Nevada